John Preston Solinger (August 7, 1965 – June 26, 2021) was an American singer known for being the lead vocalist of the hard rock/heavy metal band Skid Row from 1999 to 2015.

Career

Solinger 
Johnny Solinger moved to the Dallas–Fort Worth area as a young boy, where he was exposed to hard rock and country music, and fell in love with them. In 1990, he formed the rock band Solinger in Dallas, recording four independent records: Solinger, Solinger II, Chain Link Fence, and Solinger Live. He enjoyed live performance and radio success throughout the Southwest.

Skid Row 
In 1999, Skid Row members Dave "The Snake" Sabo, Rachel Bolan, and Scotti Hill hired Solinger to replace previous lead vocalist Sebastian Bach. In 2000, Skid Row was the opening band on Kiss's "Farewell Tour."

With over 15 years in the band, he was their longest-serving vocalist, and performed on the studio albums Thickskin (2003) and Revolutions Per Minute (2006), along with Chapters 1 and 2 of the United World Rebellion EP trilogy.

In April 2015, Solinger was fired from Skid Row, and was briefly replaced by Tony Harnell, who was eventually replaced by ZP Theart.

Solo career 
In 2008, Solinger pursued a country music solo career. His first country album was only released regionally and is filled with both country and rock. The album includes the song "You Lie", which he recorded with his band mates from Skid Row.

Death 
Solinger died on June 26, 2021, one month after he revealed that he was suffering from liver failure. He was 55 years old.

Discography

With Skid Row 
Thickskin (2003)
Revolutions Per Minute (2006)
United World Rebellion: Chapter One (2013)
Rise of the Damnation Army – United World Rebellion: Chapter Two (2014)

Solo 
Chain Link Fence (2000)
Solinger (2003)
Solinger II (2003)
Johnny Solinger (2008)

The (Party) Dolls 
Doll House Rock

References

External links 

 
 

1966 births
2021 deaths
Skid Row (American band) members
American heavy metal singers
American male singer-songwriters
Country musicians from Texas
American people of German descent
Singer-songwriters from Texas